Angaraag Mahanta (born 24 November 1975), known by his stagename Papon, is an Indian playback singer and composer from Assam. Papon has also sung in many languages apart from Assamese like Hindi, Bengali, Tamil and Marathi. He is the lead vocalist and founder of the folk-fusion band Papon and The East India Company.

Career
Papon started his musical career in 1998 with the Assamese song "Nasaba Sokule" from the album Snigdha Junak. In 2004 he released his first album, Junaki Raati

Papon made his debut in Bollywood with the song "Om mantra" from the film Strings - bound by faith in 2006. In 2011, his song was "Jiyein Kyun" from the movie Dum Maro Dum which was his first big hit. In 2014, he sang "Lakeerein", which is a poem by Gulzar, for the film Kya Dilli Kya Lahore and "Sun RI Bavli" for Nagesh Kukunoor's film Lakshmi. In 2015, he sang "Moh moh ke dhage" for the film Dum Laga Ke Haisha and "Humnava" in Hamari Adhuri Kahani (2015). In 2016, he sang "Bulleya" for the film Sultan. In August 2016, Red Bull released "Hometown Heroes," a seven-part documentary web series that revisits the story of Papon's youth and rising career. Papon's 2018 song "Baba Bolta Hain Bas Ho Gaya", from the movie Sanju, comments on differences between the real Sanju and the "reel" Sanju.

Television
In 2013, Papon was responsible for the theme song for MTV Roadies X: Battle for Glory – "Jajabor" (Jajabor being an Assemese word for yayavar - "traveler").

In 2017, he was one of the judge in The Voice India Kids.

Film

Band

In 2007, Papon formed an electronic folk-fusion band called Papon and The East India Company. The band consists of Papon on vocals, Brin Desai and Hameem Kader on live electronics, Jinti on lead guitars, Kirti on percussion and Dipu on bass and Tanmay on Drums The six members came from backgrounds varying from Assamese folk to metal and blues to trip hop.

The band has performed twice at the SAARC Music Band Festival in New Delhi, the Eastwind Festival, and the Kovalam Literary Festival and has performed overseas with Sutasi in Singapore. The band took a two-year break in the wait for a solo album which was released internationally at the end of 2011. The band is back in action in November with 4 big festivals in the same month. They also played at the October Fest in Bangalore, NH7 Weekender fest in Pune and the Rock for Rights concert in New Delhi.

Personal life and education
His father, Khagen Mahanta, died on 12 June 2014.

He now lives in Mumbai with his wife Shweta Mishra Mahanta. They have two children.

He initially went there for Architecture but late enrolled himself to a degree in English Literature in Delhi University. His spent some time in Ramjas College before he shifted to Moti Lal Nehru College. He eventually dropped out on the 3rd year of college.

Controversies
Papon, who was a mentor and judge on The Voice India Kids, on Facebook live-streaming from his own page was seen putting Holi colors on an 11-year-old girl, and was alleged on media and social media to have kissed her. On 24 Feb 2018, The police lodged a case against him after a complaint from the Assam State Commission for Protection of Child Rights. Along with the other contestants present on the video streaming and their respective guardians, the parents of the minor also denied allegations against Papon stating that it was fatherly love shown by Papon and there was no kiss. 
He left the reality TV show as judge due to the allegations.

A court of law later found insufficient reason to charge Papon based on the police investigation reports and closed the case and stated that the case arose due to a mistake of fact.

Collaborations
Papon has featured in albums which carry the labels of MDR Records, in a collaboration with Times Music, and has also featured in the soundtrack of Bollywood films Dum Maaro Dum, I Am Kalam, Soundtrack, Patang, and most recently Barfi!. He also featured on the Indian leg of the show Coke Studio @ MTV. He performed on the show Global Indian Film Awards with MIDIval Punditz, Kailash Kher and Shubha Mudgal. He also appeared on Star world India, Episode six of The Dewarists with Rabbi Shergill and recorded a song "Khule Da Rabb". Papon has also worked with Shantanu Moitra in the 4th season of The Dewarists for 'O Megh' which is inspired by Rabindranath Tagore's poem of same name.

Discography

Awards

See also
 List of Indian playback singerback singers

References

External links

 

Living people
Indian male singer-songwriters
Indian singer-songwriters
Bollywood playback singers
Assamese playback singers
Musicians from Guwahati
People from Nagaon district
People from Guwahati
Indian male pop singers
Screen Awards winners
International Indian Film Academy Awards winners
Indian male playback singers
Singers from Assam
Singers from Guwahati
Indian folk-pop singers
1975 births
Ramjas College alumni